Joly is a township in the Almaguin Highlands region of Parry Sound District of the Canadian province of Ontario.

The township has no named communities within its boundaries; all addresses in the township are rural routes assigned to the adjacent communities of South River, Sundridge, Hartfell or Pevensey. The South River-Sundridge District Airport is in Joly.

Demographics 

Mother tongue:
 English as first language: 90.2%
 French as first language: 1.6%
 Other as first language: 8.2%

See also
List of townships in Ontario

References

External links

Municipalities in Parry Sound District
Single-tier municipalities in Ontario
Township municipalities in Ontario